The 1923–24 Clarkson Golden Knights men's ice hockey season was the 4th season of play for the program. The team was coached by Gordon Croskery in his first season.

Season
Entering its fourth year, Clarkson's ice hockey team were now without the services of three-year captain Bill Johnson. Two events demonstrated that the team would be able to survive after his graduation, however; a temporary rink was built next to Main Street so that the players could both practice and play on consistent ice, and the team secured the services of a coach to help improve their game. Gordon Croskery, an assistant professor of Engineering at the school and a World War I veteran, was a Canadian who had grown up with the game and would be able to teach some of the finer points to the players. While he technically wasn't the team's coach, he is typically regarded as the program's first bench boss.

Clarkson's season began with a game against Hamilton and the loss of Johnson's offensive touch was felt in their 0–5 loss. The team's defence shut down Ogdensburg in the next game, winning 1–0 in overtime. After losing the next two games, Clarkson earned two more shutouts on the year, defeating a pair of Vermont colleges before the Green Mountain State got its revenge with Saint Michael's handing Tech their fourth loss of the year in double overtime.

Russell Sanford served as team manager with Roland Fitch as an assistant.

Roster

Standings

Schedule and Results

|-
!colspan=12 style=";" | Regular Season

References

Clarkson Golden Knights men's ice hockey seasons
Clarkson
Clarkson
Clarkson
Clarkson